Whitemoor is a village in St Stephen-in-Brannel civil parish in mid Cornwall, United Kingdom. It is northeast of Nanpean.

Whitemoor Community Primary School
Whitemoor Community Primary School is a small village primary school, situated between St Dennis and Nanpean in the Clay Area of Cornwall. The school has since changed status to an Academy.

The school has actually been in Whitemoor for over a hundred years: but with a big new hall and airy classrooms, the pupils enjoy a modern environment. Its extensive grounds boast a "Pirate Ship", a Sports Field, a hard play area and a Science Garden.

Whitemoor is also home to the Dorothy Clay Pit.

References

External links

Whitemoor Community Primary School

Villages in Cornwall